Albert Grachayevich Mnatsakanyan (born 9 September 1999) is an Armenian and Russian football player.

Club career
He made his debut in the Russian Football National League for FC Tekstilshchik Ivanovo on 24 October 2020 in a game against FC Shinnik Yaroslavl.

References

External links
 Profile by Russian Football National League
 

1999 births
People from Vagharshapat
Living people
Russian footballers
Armenian footballers
Armenia youth international footballers
Association football midfielders
FC Yerevan players
FC Ararat Yerevan players
FC Tekstilshchik Ivanovo players
Armenian First League players
Armenian Premier League players
Russian First League players
Russian Second League players